The Green National Committee (GNC) is the central governing body of the Green Party of the United States. The committee is composed of over 150 delegates from every affiliated state party and recognized caucus. The GNC oversees all national party functions and elects a steering committee to oversee day-to-day operations.

Responsibilities of the committee include organizing annual meetings and the presidential nominating convention, developing a party platform, and coordinating campaigns from the local, state, and federal levels.

National Committee
The Green National Committee (GNC) serves as the decision-making body of the Green Party of the United States. It consists of 150 (+10) delegates, with additional delegates for party caucuses.

The delegates serving on the GNC are not synonymous to the presidential nominating delegates elected to the Green National Convention (also known as GNC) of which consists greater than 2.5 times the number of delegates.

2019 Delegate Apportionment

Additional Delegates
 Black Caucus 2
 Latinx Caucus 2
 Lavender Caucus 2
 Women's Caucus 2
 Youth Caucus 2

Steering committee
The steering committee is composed of seven co-chairs, acting as a collective executive, together with the secretary and treasurer.  They are elected by the delegates who serve on the Green National Committee. The following are current and former officers of Green Party US.

National Co-chairs

 Ahmed Eltouny, New Jersey
 Christopher Stella, Louisiana
 Rei Stone-Grover, Michigan
 Garret Wasserman, Pennsylvania
 Margaret Elisabeth, Washington
 Tamar Yager, Virginia
 Anita Rios, Ohio

Secretary
 Kristen Combs, Pennsylvania

Treasurer
 Hillary Kane, Pennsylvania

Standing committees
The GNC has several standing committees:

Accreditation
Animal Rights
Annual National Meeting
Ballot Access
Bylaws, Rules, Policies & Procedures
Communications
Coordinated Campaign (Limited to 10 members)
Dispute Resolution
Diversity
EcoAction
Finance
Fundraising
Green Pages (newspaper editorial board)
International
Media
Merchandising
Outreach
Peace Action
Platform
Presidential Campaign Support

Other Committees
The following committees are effectively responsible for allocating and certifying delegates to the GNC:

Apportionment Review (Limited to 8 members)
Apportionment Tabulation (Limited to 7 members)
Credentials (Limited to 15 members)

Fundraising
The Green Senatorial Campaign Committee (GSCC) is the Federal Elections Commission entity that the Coordinated Campaign Committee utilizes to support Green Party candidates from the senatorial down to the local level.

See also
Democratic National Committee
Libertarian National Committee
Republican National Committee

References

Green Party of the United States
 
Green Party of the United States organizations
Executive committees of political parties